In the New Zealand Parliament, the Leader of the House is the government minister appointed by the Prime Minister of New Zealand to be responsible for the management of government business in the House of Representatives. The Leader of the House is also an ex officio member of the Parliamentary Service Commission.

History and functions
The first leader of the House was appointed in 1978, although a similar office had existed in Australia since 1951 and another in the United Kingdom for several centuries. The responsibilities of the leader of the House were previously functions exercised by the prime minister.

The leader of the House serves three main functions:
 Moving motions for the Government that relate to House and committee procedure
 Determining the order of Government business in the House
 The primary responsibility for the Government's lawmaking programme

List of leaders of the House
The following individuals have been appointed as leader of the New Zealand House of Representatives:

Key

See also
Leader of the Legislative Council (equivalent in the New Zealand Legislative Council)

Notes

References

Parliament of New Zealand
1978 establishments in New Zealand
Lists of political office-holders in New Zealand